Pirlimycin hydrochloride belongs to the lincosamide class of antimicrobials. Under the trade name Pirsue, it is used in the treatment of mastitis in cattle.


Activity
Pirlimycin is active against Gram-positive bacteria, specifically Staphylococcus aureus and coagulase negative species of Staphylococcus and Streptococcus. It has no activity against Gram-negative bacteria.

Mechanism of action
It is bacteriostatic and acts by inhibiting bacterial protein synthesis via binding with the 50S subunit of the ribosome.

References

Lincosamides
Veterinary drugs